American rock band LCD Soundsystem has released four studio albums, three extended plays (EP), one compilation album, two remix albums, three live albums, eighteen singles, and fourteen music videos. The music of LCD Soundsystem is a mix of dance music and punk, and contains influences of disco. The band first gained attention when they released the single "Losing My Edge" on DFA Records, which became a well-known indie song in 2002. They then released more singles over the next few years and their self-titled debut album to critical acclaim. The album was certified gold in the UK but failed to chart on the US Billboard 200.

In 2006, the band released the 46-minute composition "45:33", "a conceptual jogging soundtrack" commissioned by Nike, although frontman James Murphy stated that he wanted to make a long-form record in the style of E2-E4 by Manuel Göttsching. LCD Soundsystem's second full-length album, Sound of Silver, was released to extremely positive reviews from critics and peaked at number 46 on the Billboard 200. Sound of Silver spawned three singles, including "All My Friends", which was named one of the best tracks of the 2000s by Pitchfork and Rolling Stone. In 2007 the album was nominated for a Grammy Award for Best Electronic/Dance Album, and the Shortlist Music Prize. Metacritic reported it to be the tenth best reviewed album of 2007.

LCD Soundsystem released their third studio album, This Is Happening in May 2010. The album was LCD Soundsystem's first to debut in the top ten of the Billboard 200, selling around 31,000 copies in its first week of sales. The band officially disbanded in 2011, after playing their last show at Madison Square Garden. They eventually reunited in late 2015, embarked on a world tour, and released their fourth studio album, American Dream, in September 2017. It went on to become the band's first number-one album in the United States.

Albums

Studio albums

Compilation albums

Remix albums

Live albums

Extended plays

Singles

Notes

Promotional singles

Music videos

References

General

Specific

External links
 Official site
 

Discographies of American artists
Electronic music discographies
Punk rock discographies